Livingstone Hospital is a large Provincial government-funded hospital situated in Korsten, Port Elizabeth in South Africa. It is a tertiary hospital and forms part of the Port Elizabeth Hospital Complex.

The hospital departments include The Emergency Department, the Paediatric, the Out Patients Department, Surgical Services, Medical Services, Operating Theatre & CSSD Services, a Pharmacy, Anti-Retroviral (ARV) treatment for HIV/AIDS Wellness Clinic/ID clinic, Post Trauma Counseling Services, Occupational Services, X-ray Services, Occupational Therapy, Physiotherapy, Speech Therapy, NHLS Laboratory, Oral Health Care Provides Maxillofacial Facial, Laundry Services, Kitchen Services and a Mortuary.

Coat of arms
The hospital assumed a coat of arms in 1958, described as "Azure, a pyramid Argent charged with a representation of the Donkin lighthouse Gules".  The arms were registered at the Bureau of Heraldry in 1968, the lighthouse being incorrectly described as a "campanile proper".  The coat of arms was designed by Ivan Mitford-Barberton.

References

External links
 Livingstone Hospital

Hospitals in the Eastern Cape
Buildings and structures in Port Elizabeth